The 2021–22 Primera Divisió was the 27th season of top-tier football in Andorra. The season began on 19 September 2021. The league champion qualified to compete in the 2022–23 UEFA Champions League.

Inter Club d'Escaldes were the defending Primera Divisió champions.

Teams
Penya Encarnada were relegated from the Primera Divisió after finishing in last place the previous season. Ordino were promoted to the Primera Divisió having won the previous season's Segona Divisió title.

Regular season

League table

Results
The eight clubs played each other three times for a total of twenty-one matches each in the regular season.

Championship and relegation rounds
Regular season records are carried over to championship and relegation rounds.

Championship round

Relegation round

Primera Divisió play-offs
The seventh-placed team, third-placed in the relegation round, from the Primera Divisió and the runners-up from the Segona Divisió played a play-off over two legs for a place in the 2022–23 Primera Divisió.

Statistics

Top scorers

See also
 Segona Divisió
 Copa Constitució

References

External links
   

Primera Divisió seasons
Andorra
Primera Divisio